Downend is an affluent residential outer suburb of Bristol, England, the housing stock is typically terraced Victorian, 1930s and 1950s semi-detached and detached. It is in the South Gloucestershire local district, located to the northeast of Bristol and bordered by the Bristol City suburb of Fishponds, and the South Gloucestershire suburbs of Staple Hill, Frenchay, Mangotsfield, and Emersons Green.

On 19 January 2020 The Sunday Times ran an article which named Downend as one of the UK's best suburbs.

Downend forms, with the suburb of Bromley Heath, the civil parish of Downend and Bromley Heath, created in 2003.

Governance
An electoral ward in the same name exists. The total population of the ward at the 2011 census was 10,785.

Downend residents are represented by the Mayor of the West of England, Dan Norris.

Notable residents 

W. G. Grace, the cricketer, was born at Downend House on North Street. The house overlooks the ground of Downend Cricket Club.

Olympic bronze medal winner Jenny Jones (snowboarder) was also born in Downend.

Edward Hodges Baily sculptor of Nelson's column.

See also
 Downend air crash

References

External links

 Downend School Website
 Rotary Club of Fishponds & Downend
 Downend Round Table
 Downend & Bromley Heath Parish Council Website
 Downend Parish Magazine – August 1905

Areas of Bristol
South Gloucestershire District